Djamal Mohamed (born 8 October 1990 in Marseille, France) is a former footballer who played as a defensive midfielder. Born in France, he represented the Comoros national team internationally, earning three caps.

References

Living people
1990 births
French footballers
Footballers from Marseille
Comorian footballers
Association football midfielders
Comoros international footballers
French emigrants to the Comoros